Dymov (from дым meaning smoke) is a Russian masculine surname, its feminine counterpart is Dymova. It may refer to
Osip Dymov, central character in the story "The Grasshopper" (1892) by Anton Chekhov
Osip Dymov (writer), pen name of the Russian writer Yosif (Osip) Perelman (1878–1959)
Sergei Dymov (born 1975), Russian football player

See also
Dimov (disambiguation)

Russian-language surnames